Jocelyn Lorette Brown (born November 25, 1950), sometimes credited as Jocelyn Shaw, is an American R&B and dance singer. Although she has only one Billboard Hot 100 chart entry solely in her name, she has an extensive background in the music industry and is well known in the world of dance music. Brown sang on 23 hit singles from the Official UK Singles Chart, 8 of which have reached the top 20.

Biography

Early life
Brown was born on November 25, 1950, in Kinston, North Carolina into a musical family. Her aunt, Barbara Roy, was a singer in a female group called 'Ecstasy, Passion and Pain' whilst her mother, two aunts, cousin and grandmother were all accomplished singers. She spent her pre-school years being looked after by her grandmother in Kinston.

However, it was her aunt's musical success which gave her the inspiration to become a singer herself. She began singing with gospel choirs in church in Brooklyn and became a favourite soloist in Washington, D.C. at her uncle's church.  She then left the gospel genre for a more secular form of music, singing along with a local band called 'Machine' and New York-based funk and disco group Kleeer.

Career
Brown further developed her musical career in the late 1970s singing on records by studio-created bands like Revanche, Musique, Inner Life, Disco-Tex and the Sex-O-Lettes, Cerrone, Bad Girls, Chic, and Change, later singing with the Salsoul Orchestra, Soiree or Dazzle in 1979.

In 1980, she appeared in Bette Midler's concert movie Divine Madness singing backup as a "Harlette" along with Ula Hedwig and Diva Gray.

In 1984, Brown released a number of singles in her own name, including "Somebody Else's Guy" (which she co-wrote and was later re-recorded in 1997 by CeCe Peniston), which reached #2 on the Billboard R&B Singles chart (#75 on the Hot 100) and became the title track of her first album (a compilation of tracks from her career to date), released that same year. Although she scored another big Dance (and minor R&B) hit two years later with the oft-sampled tune, "Love's Gonna Get You", her solo career never really took off and she continued to sing on other people's records.

She has more than twenty hits on the Hot Dance Music/Club Play chart, four of which have hit number one (not including two #1 dance hits she had in the late 1970s as a guest vocalist with Patrick Adams' studio band, Musique). She continues to record house music and have chart hits in the 21st century. She toured with Boy George, as a backing vocalist, worldwide with Culture Club in 1985 and appeared on their 1986 album, From Luxury to Heartache. In 1987, she co-wrote with Boy George his top 30 United Kingdom hit, "Keep Me in Mind".

Since 1990, she has lived in London. In 1990, the line "I've got the power" was sampled from her 1985 dance hit, "Love's Gonna Get You" by electronica group Snap! for their worldwide hit, "The Power" as well as hip hop group Boogie Down Productions on their single "Love's Gonna Get'cha (Material Love)" and was the basis for the UK top 3 hit "I'm Gonna Get You" by Bizarre Inc. featuring Angie Brown. Brown also appeared on Right Said Fred's smash hit "Don't Talk Just Kiss" and in 1994, she released a duet on "No More Tears (Enough Is Enough)" with Kym Mazelle.

Brown appeared on both seasons of BBC One's celebrity singing talent show Just the Two of Us; first with TV presenter Matt Allwright (placing sixth), then with actor John Bardon from EastEnders (placing fourth). In 2006, Brown released a CD entitled Unreleased.

In 2007, Brown collaborated with the AllStars both live, at a series of music festivals in the UK, and in the studio recording of their new album, All About the Music. She sang at the funeral of gangster Joey Pyle. She also sang the United States national anthem, "The Star-Spangled Banner", at Wembley Stadium, for the first ever regular season American football game played on foreign soil, between the New York Giants and the Miami Dolphins.

In 2011, she returned to British reality television, appearing in the second series of Popstar to Operastar, but was voted out in week two, the second of two heats, after being sent home by the judging panel when placed in the bottom two of the public phone vote. She sang a 'gypsy song' from the musical Carmen, well known for its accomplished arias and performances.

In both June 2012 and 2013, Brown appeared at the open air 'Happy Days Festival' held at Imber Court in Esher, Surrey.

Discography

Albums

Singles

See also
 List of Billboard number-one dance club songs
 List of artists who reached number one on the U.S. Dance Club Songs chart
 List of disco artists (F–K)
 List of house music artists

References

External links
 
 Artist page at Digisoul Records
 MySpace page
 Allmusic [ entry]

1950 births
Living people
People from Kinston, North Carolina
Singers from North Carolina
20th-century African-American women singers
American dance musicians
American house musicians
American rhythm and blues singers
American expatriates in England
Prelude Records artists
Salsoul Records artists
Popstar to Operastar contestants
American mezzo-sopranos
American women in electronic music
Harlettes members
Incognito (band) members
Acid jazz musicians
21st-century African-American people
21st-century African-American women
Change (band) members